Guro Nestaker (born 15 August 1998) is a Norwegian handball player for Storhamar HE.

She also represented Norway at the 2015 European Women's U-17 Handball Championship, placing 11th and at the 2016 Women's Youth World Handball Championship, placing 4th.

Achievements
Junior World Championship:
Silver Medalist: 2018
Norwegian League:
Silver Medalist: 2018/2019, 2019/2020, 2020/2021
Norwegian Cup:
Finalist: 2018, 2019

Individual awards
 Best Defender of the 2016 Women's Youth World Handball Championship.

References

1998 births
Living people
Sportspeople from Gjøvik
Norwegian female handball players
21st-century Norwegian women